These hits topped the Dutch Top 40 in 2000 (see 2000 in music).

See also
2000 in music
2000 in the Netherlands

Dutch Top 40
Netherlands
2000